100 Ways to Murder Your Wife (in Chinese 殺妻二人組) is a 1986 Hong Kong comedy film directed by Kenny Bee and starring Bee, Anita Mui, Chow Yun-fat and Joey Wong.

Plot
Two well-respected football players meet one night in a Hong Kong bar. Roberto is a highly rated striker for a popular team while Football Fa is a star goalkeeper. Over a few drinks, the pair share compliments and, as the evening draws on, their problems. As things turn out, both of these cowardly men have the same major problem: their wives. Roberto's wife Anita constantly nags him and designs outrageous outfits that she insists he wears. Meanwhile, Football Fa is insanely jealous about his beautiful wife Wong Siu-yin and her popularity with his team-mates. Falling into a drunken stupor, both men foolishly agree to get rid of each other's wives. Football Fa seems to have succeeded when he goes to Roberto's house and wakes up thinking he has done the deed. In fact, Roberto's wife has left thinking that her husband is with another woman. These two misunderstandings remain hidden though and Football Fa, recovering from the distressing thought of being a murderer, insists that Roberto returns the favour. What follows is an elaborate series of ideas to achieve this dubious goal and get away with it free from blame.

Cast
Kenny Bee as Roberto
Anita Mui as Anita
Chow Yun-fat as Football Fa
Joey Wong as Wong Siu-yin
Wong Jing as Mr. Wong
Eric Yeung as George
Bennett Pang as Bomb seller
Anthony Chan as Bridegroom Chan Chi-to (cameo)
Siu Woon-ching as Bride Tsui Ching-ching
Danny Yip as Reverend at wedding ceremony
Lai Mei-po
Wu Ma as Bathroom attendant (cameo)
Angela Chan as Anita's neighbour
Angela Leung as Anita's neighbour
Sandy Lamb as Anita's neighbour
Shing Fui-On as Fa's football teammate
Alex Ng as Fa's football teammate
Lee Yiu-king as Fa's football teammate
Shing Fuk-on as Fa's football teammate
Leung Mei-kei
Alan Tsui
Lee Man-piu as Fa's birthday party guest
Raymond Lee as BBQ Pork seller
Sze Kai-keung as Love Gay at gay club
Alan Tam (cameo)
Ho Kam-kong as Match commentator
Yat-poon Chai as traffic cop (cameo)
Cho Yuen-tat as Journey of Love at gay bar
Poon Man-kit as BBQ Pork seller
Cheung Yuen-wah as Reporter
Annabelle Lui as Reporter
Kobe Wong as Parking valet
Wan Chi Keung as Party guest

Box office
The film grossed HK$14,106,643 at the Hong Kong box office during its theatrical run from 5 to 19 June 1986 in Hong Kong.

See also
Anita Mui filmography
Chow Yun-fat filmography
Wong Jing filmography

References

External links

100 Ways to Murder Your Wife at Hong Kong Cinemagic

1986 films
1986 comedy films
Hong Kong slapstick comedy films
1980s Cantonese-language films
Golden Harvest films
Films set in Hong Kong
Films shot in Hong Kong
1986 directorial debut films
1980s Hong Kong films